Inchekeh may refer to:
 Inchekeh, Saqqez
 Inchekeh, Ziviyeh, Saqqez County